Cheshmeh Sefid (also Romanized as Cheshmeh Sefīd and Chashmeh Safid; also known as Cheshmeh Sefīd Rūtvand) is a village in Howmeh-ye Kerend Rural District, in the Central District of Dalahu County, Kermanshah Province, Iran. At the 2006 census, its population was 432, in 103 families.

References 

Populated places in Dalahu County